EEV or EeV may refer to:

 English Electric Valve Company, a designer, developer and manufacturer of electronic components and sub-systems
 Enhanced environmentally friendly vehicle, a car category used in European emission standards
 Equine encephalosis virus, a species of virus
 European embedded value, a type of embedded value in finance
 EeV (1018 electronvolts), a unit of energy

See also
 EEVBlog (Electronics Engineering Video Blog), a blog and YouTube channel by David L. Jones